Ilembula is a town and ward in Wanging'ombe district in the Njombe Region of the Tanzanian Southern Highlands. Its population according to the 2002 Tanzanian census is 18,126.

International relations

Twin towns, Sister cities & Partnership cities
Ilembula has a partnership relationship with:
 Oulu

References

Wards of Iringa Region